Mauricio Alejo (born 1969 in Mexico City) is an artist based in New York and Mexico City. His photographs and videos record everyday objects, sometimes cut or painted, set up in absurd arrangements.

He has participated in group exhibitions at the Bronx Museum of the Arts, Miami Art Central, Museo Nacional Centro de Arte Reina Sofía and the 8th Havana Biennial.

References

External links 
Galería OMR 

1969 births
Living people
Mexican photographers
American photographers
American video artists